The 1978 Ball State Cardinals football team was an American football team that represented Ball State University in the Mid-American Conference (MAC) during the 1978 NCAA Division I-A football season. In its first season under head coach Dwight Wallace, the team compiled a 10–1 record (8–0 against conference opponents) and won the MAC championship. Ball state did not have another 10-win season until 2008, when they started the season at 12-0 before losing their conference championship game and their bowl game. The team played its home games at Ball State Stadium in Muncie, Indiana.

The team's statistical leaders included Dave Wilson with 1,037 passing yards, Archie Currin with 735 rushing yards, Ray Hinton with 417 receiving yards, and Mark O'Connell with 60 points scored. Brady Hoke was a member of the team.

Schedule

References

Ball State
Ball State Cardinals football seasons
Mid-American Conference football champion seasons
Ball State Cardinals football